Non-specific polyamine oxidase (polyamine oxidase, Fms1, AtPAO3) is an enzyme with systematic name polyamine:oxygen oxidoreductase (3-aminopropanal or 3-acetamidopropanal-forming). This enzyme catalyses the following chemical reaction

 (1) spermine + O2 + H2O  spermidine + 3-aminopropanal + H2O2
 (2) spermidine + O2 + H2O  putrescine + 3-aminopropanal + H2O2
 (3) N1-acetylspermine + O2 + H2O  spermidine + 3-acetamidopropanal + H2O2
 (4) N1-acetylspermidine + O2 + H2O  putrescine + 3-acetamidopropanal + H2O2

This enzyme is flavoprotein (FAD).

References

External links 
 

EC 1.5.3